Algan may refer to:
 Algen, Kohgiluyeh and Boyer-Ahmad (الگن - Algen)
 Algan, Markazi (الگان - Algān)
 Algan, Qom (الگان - Algān)
 Algan (horse), French-trained racehorse active in the 1990s

People with the surname
Ayla Algan (born 1937), Turkish actress and singer
Zeynep Sibel Algan (born 1955), Turkish female diplomat

Other Uses
 Aluminium gallium nitride (AlGaN), a semiconductor material